Wólka  is a village in the administrative district of Gmina Słupia Konecka, within Końskie County, Świętokrzyskie Voivodeship, in south-central Poland.

In 2008, the village had a population of 400.

References

Villages in Końskie County